Fresh Sounds Records (also known as Fresh Sounds Inc) was an independent record label from Lawrence, Kansas, run by local music promoter Bill Rich.  Acts that have been on the label include Get Smart!, the Embarrassment, the Mortal Micronotz, Start, SPK, the Homestead Grays and William S. Burroughs.

History
The first releases were flexi discs that were issued with Rich's "Talk Talk" magazine.  The first four albums issued by the label were issued on cassette only before the label started issuing its releases on vinyl.

Fresh Sounds From Middle America
The "Fresh Sounds From Middle America" series of compilation albums was organized by Bill Rich as a way to promote regional bands on a national level.

Discography

References

External links

American record labels
Rock record labels
Companies based in Kansas